Hoch wie nie   (loosely translated, "Higher than Ever Before") is the name of the 2007 posthumously-published 'Best of' double album by Austrian musician Falco, who died in 1998. The Longplayer was published on Falco's 50th birthday. It was released in two versions. The Limited edition additionally contains the song "Urban Tropical" (original flipside of the "Rock Me Amadeus" single from 1985), which was only available on vinyl before. There is also a Falco DVD with the same name available now, which is a documentary about Falco's life and career. In the non-European countries the album was released on 2 August 2007.

Tracks

CD 1
 Der Kommissar
 Vienna Calling (Wait For The Extended Mix)
 Jeanny
 Emotional (Album Version)
 The Sound of Musik (Album Version)
 Junge Roemer (Album Version)
 Wiener Blut
 Hoch wie nie
 Munich Girls
 Nachtflug
 No Answer (Hallo Deutschland)
 Nur mit dir
 Helden von Heute
 Kann es Liebe sein (Album Version)
 Ihre Tochter
 Auf der Flucht
 Ganz Wien

CD 2
 Rock Me Amadeus (European Gold Mix)
 Maschine brennt (Album Version)
 America
 Out Of The Dark
 Egoist (Album Version)
 Brillantin' Brutal'
 Data De Groove (Album Version)
 Verdammt wir leben noch (Album Version)
 Naked (Original Version)
 Mutter, der Mann mit dem Koks ist da
 Titanic
 Europa (Album Version)
 Coming Home (Jeanny Part 2, Ein Jahr danach)
 It's All Over Now, Baby Blue - Rough Mix
 Tribute To Falco - by the Bolland Project (Radio Mix)
 Männer des Westens (T. Börger Version 2007)
 Urban Tropical (Single Version) - Deluxe version only

Männer des Westens

There is also a new version of "Männer des Westens" on this album. The Song was popular only with insiders before. The renewed version contains a Rap-similar rhythm in the background. The single was released on 16 February 2007. On the occasion of the single's release, German TV channels Sat. 1 and ProSieben started an advertising campaign for 70.000€.

Charts

Weekly charts

Year-end charts

References

Falco (musician) albums
Compilation albums published posthumously
2007 compilation albums
German-language albums